WYCT (98.7 FM) is a radio station known as "Cat Country 98.7". The main studio is located on Plantation Road in Pensacola, Florida, and station caters to the Pensacola, Gulf Breeze, Pace and Milton markets as well as Baldwin County, Alabama.  Its studios are in Pensacola and its transmitter is located west of Muscogee, Florida just inside Alabama.

History
Owner Dave Hoxeng applied to the FCC in 1987 for a new Pensacola station at 98.7. After long delays in winning a license in Washington, he moved to Pensacola in 2002 to construct the new 100,000-watt FM radio station from the ground up. Dave and wife Mary debuted the radio station as Christmas Radio 98.7 in November 2003, and switched to Country music on December 26, 2003.

According to Solutions Broadcast Research and The Radio Index, WYCT is the Pensacola radio station that delivers the largest Pensacola audience of adults aged 25 to 54.

WYCT won "Station of the Year" from the Academy of Country Music (ACM) in 2007, 2009 and 2011. Its morning show "The CatPack" won "ACM Personalities of the Year" in 2009 & 2019. These awards were in the ACM Small Market division and were presented during the ACM Awards Show in Las Vegas. The station won the "NAB Service to America" in 2009 & 2019. NAB recognized WYCT's service to its community with "Crystal Awards" in 2013, 2017 & 2019. The CMA awarded "Station of the Year" to WYCT in 2017 & 2019.  Brent & Candy were nominated for CMA "Personalities of the Year" in 2018.  These in the mid-market category.

HD radio
WYCT's HD Radio signal is multiplexed, with the HD3 channel carrying a simulcast of NewsRadio 92.3 / AM1620 WNRP.  The HD4 channel carries a simulcast of ESPN PENSACOLA/1330 WEBY.

In August 2018, WYCT had added sports talk ESPN Pensacola on its HD2 subchannel, returning the network to the market for the first time since WBSR's flip to Christian music. The programming was simulcast on 94.5 W233CM in Pensacola, and began airing on WEBY/1330 and its 99.1 translator in August 2019.

WYCT-HD2 and W233CM/94.5 continued to simulcast WEBY until November 5, 2019, when they began stunting with Christmas music as Christmas Radio 94.5. The stunt continued on with a loop of "Baby Shark" from January 1 though 13, 2020, after which the stations launched a new adult contemporary format as Pensacola's PLAYLIST 94.5.

References

External links

YCT
2003 establishments in Florida
Radio stations established in 2003